Odeen may refer to:

Philip Odeen, corporate and government position executive
Odeen Ishmael (1948–2019), veteran Guyanese diplomat
Odeen, a leading character in The Gods Themselves